Griffin Theatre Company is an Australian theatre specialising in new works, based in Sydney. Founded in 1979, it is the resident theatre company at the SBW Stables Theatre in Kings Cross.  the artistic director is Declan Green.

Artistic directors
Declan Greene (2020–present)
Lee Lewis (August 2012–2020) 
 Sam Strong (2010–2012)
 Nick Marchand (2006–2010)
 David Berthold (2003–2006)
Ros Horin (1992–2003)
Ian Watson
Peter Kingston (inaugural artistic director)

History
Founded in 1979 its original founders were Peter Carmody, Penny Cook, Eadie Kurzer, Jenny Laing-Peach, and Rosemarie Lenzo. The organisation held their first meetings in Laing-Peach's cottage in Griffin Street, Surry Hills. Their first project was to present the Irish play The Ginger Man by J.P. Donleavy at the Kirk Gallery in Cleveland Street, Surry Hills on 6 April 1979. The first Artistic Director was Peter Kingston who served until the appointment of Ian B Watson in 1988.

For the 1984 season the company was awarded The Sydney Critic's Circle Award for "the most significant contribution to theatre that year." In 1986 The SBW Foundation Purchased the Stables Theatre and offered the company a lifetime rent-free lease.

The theatre focuses on "all-Australia" talent and works.

Cate Blanchett and Jacqueline McKenzie began their professional careers at Griffin. The films Lantana, The Boys, and The Heartbreak Kid (which later spun off into the television series Heartbreak High) were based on plays produced by Griffin. Away, Australia's most produced contemporary play, also started at the company.

Programs

The Batch Festival
In 2018 Griffin launched an annual experimental theatre festival, the Batch Festival. It is a three-week festival featuring multiple shows each day, curated to highlight emerging artists. It was paused in 2021 owing to the COVID-19 pandemic in Australia.

Griffin Independent and Griffin Special Extras
Running since 2004 (then called Griffin Stablemates), in parallel to Griffin's own mainstage season of new Australian plays, Griffin Independent is an annual season of 5–6 new plays presented by independent theatre companies. In 2018, Griffin Independent was updated to Special Extras.

Awards

Griffin Award

Bestowed annually since 1998, the Griffin Award is offered to the most outstanding new work as read and judged by a panel appointed by Griffin. The award comes with a $10,000 cash prize. One stipulation on entry is that all works submitted have not been performed or produced prior.
 1998 – Catherine Zimdahl for Clark in Sarajevo
 1999 – Neil Cole for Alive at Williamstown Pier
 2000 – Ian Wilding for Below
 2001 – Verity Laughton for Burning
 2002 – Noelle Janacsewska for Songket and Patrick Van der Werf for Presence
 2003 – Brendan Cowell for Rabbit
 2004 – Debra Oswald for Mr Bailey's Minder
 2005 – Ian Wilding for The Carnivores
 2006 – Mary Rachel Brown for Australian Gothic
 2007 – Damien Millar for Emergency Sex and Other Desperate Measures
 2008 – Rick Viede for Whore
 2009 – Lachlan Philpott for Silent Disco
 2010 – Aidan Fennessy for Brutopia
 2011 – Rick Viede for A Hoax
 2012 – Vivienne Walshe for This is Where We Live
 2013 – Donna Abela for Jump for Jordan
 2014 – Angus Cerini for The Bleeding Tree
 2015 – Stephen Carleton for The Turquoise Elephant
 2016 – Melissa Reeves for The Zen of Table Tennis
 2017 – David Finnigan for Kill Climate Deniers
 2018 – Suzie Miller for On the Face of It (Prima Facie)
 2019 – Mark Rogers for Superheroes
 2020 - Dylan Van Den Berg for way back when

Griffin Studio

Griffin Studio is a year-long residency for directors, writers and dramaturgs with the company, established in 2011. It is awarded annually to one or more applicants.

Lysicrates Prize

Founded in 2015, the Lysicrates Prize is awarded annually to a play and is described as a "philanthropic initiative presented by The Lysicrates Foundation and produced by Griffin Theatre Company". The inaugural prize was won by Steve Rodgers for his play Jesus Wants Me for a Sunbeam.

Incubator Fellowship

In 2020 the company partnered with Create NSW to form the Incubator – NSW Theatre (Emerging) Fellowship program (aka Incubator Fellowship). Shortlisted fellows complete a three-month incubator program for emerging playwrights, directors, dramaturgs, designers and composers to work with the company. One of the fellows is then chosen to receive $30,000 to "pursue a self-directed program of professional development in Australia or overseas".

Winners
 2020: Ang Collins
 2021: Happy Feraren
 2022: Eve Beck

Recent seasons
Recent Griffin Theatre Company mainstage seasons are listed below.

2020 season
 Family Values by David Williamson. 17 January – 7 March 2020

2019 season
 Dead Cat Bounce by Mary Rachel Brown. 22 February – 6 April 2019
 Prima Facie by Suzie Miller. 17 May – 22 June 2019
 City of Gold by Meyne Wyatt. 26 July – 31 August 2019
 Splinter by Hilary Bell. 6 September – 12 October 2019
 First Love Is The Revolution by Rita Kalnejais. 6 September – 12 October 2019

2018 season
 Kill Climate Deniers by David Finnigan. 23 February – 7 April 2018
 Good Cook. Friendly. Clean. by Brooke Robinson. 4 May – 16 June 2018
 The Almighty Sometimes by Kendall Feaver. 27 July – 8 September 2018
 The Feather in the Web by Nick Coyle. 5 October – 17 November 2018

2017 season
 A Strategic Plan by Ross Mueller. 27 January – 11 March 2017
 The Homosexuals or 'Faggots''' by Declan Greene. 17 March – 29 April 2017
 Rice by Michele Lee. 21 July – 26 August 2017
 Diving For Pearls by Katherine Thomson. 8 September – 28 October 2017

2016 season
 Ladies Day by Alana Valentine. 5 February – 26 March 2016
 Replay by Phillip Kavanagh. 2 April – 7 May 2016
 The Literati by Justin Fleming. 27 May – 16 July 2016
 Gloria by Benedict Andrews. 26 August – 8 October 2016
 The Turquoise Elephant by Stephen Carleton. 14 October – 16 November 2016

2015 season
 Masquerade by Kate Mulvany. 7–17 January 2015
 Caress/Ache by Suzie Miller. 27 February – 11 April 2015
 The House on the Lake by Aidan Fennessy. 15 May – 20 June 2015
 The Bleeding Tree by Angus Cerini. 31 July – 5 September 2015
 A Rabbit for Kim Jong-il by Kit Brookman. 9 October – 21 November 2015

2014 season
 Emerald City by David Williamson. 17 October – 6 December 2014
 The Witches by Roald Dahl, adapted from the stage play by David Wood. 24 September – 5 October 2014
 Ugly Mugs by Peta Brady. 18 July – 24 August 2014
 Eight Gigabytes of Hardcore Pornography by Declan Greene. 2 May – 14 June 2014
 Jump for Jordan by Donna Abela 14 February – 29 March 2014
 The Serpent's Table by Darren Yap and Lee Lewis. 24–27 January 2014

2013 season
 Dreams in White - by Duncan Graham. 8 February – March 2013  
 The Bull, the Moon and the Coronet of Stars – by Van Badham. 2 May – June 2013
 Beached – by Melissa Bubnic. 17 July 31 August 2013
 The Floating World – by John Romeril. 4 October – 16 November 2013

2012 season
 The Boys – by Gordon Graham. 6 January – 3 March 2012
 The Story of Mary MacLane by Herself – by Bojana Novakovic, music by Tim Rogers, after the writings of Mary MacLane. 4 April – 12 May 2012
 Angela's Kitchen – by Paul Capsis and Julian Meyrick. 15 May – 9 June 2012
 A Hoax – by Rick Viede. 20 July – 1 September 2012
 Between Two Waves - by Ian Meadows. 5 October – 17 November 2012

2011 season
 Speaking in Tongues – by Andrew Bovell. 4 February – 19 March 2011
 Silent Disco – by Lachlan Philpott. 22 April – 4 June 2011
 And No More Shall We Part – by Tom Holloway. 29 July – 3 September 2011
 This Year's Ashes – by Jane Bodie. 7 October – 19 November 2011 
 Museum of Broken Relationships - by the Griffin Audience, in collaboration with Ian Meadows, Kate Mulvany, Shannon Murphy, Paige Rattray

2010 season
 Graces – by Angus Cerini, Elise Hearst and Lachlan Philpott. 14 September – 7 December 2010
 Love Me Tender – by Tom Holloway. 18 March – 11 April 2010
 Like A Fishbone by Anthony Weigh. 16 July – 7 August 2010
 Quack by Ian Wilding. 27 August – 2 October 2010
 Angela's Kitchen by Paul Capsis and Julian Meyrick / Associate Writer Hilary Bell. 5 November – 18 December 2010

2009 season
 The Fates – by Kamarra Bell-Wykes, Jonathan Ari Lander and Catherine Ryan. 19 May – November 2009
 Holiday – by Ranters Theatre. 4–28 February 2009
 Concussion by Ross Mueller. 13 March – 4 April 2009
 The Call – by Patricia Cornelius. 1 May – 6 June 2009
 Savage River – by Steve Rodgers. 12 June – 8 July 2009
 Strange Attractor-  by Sue Smith. 23 October – 21 November 2009

2008 season
 Seasons – by Nicki Bloom, Jonathan Gavin, Sue Smith and Rick Viede. 19 January – 8 February 2008
 China – by William Yang. 19 January – 8 February 2008
 The Kid – by Michael Gow. 22 March – 26 April 2008
 Don't Say The Words – by Tom Holloway. 4–26 July 2008
 The Modern International Dead – by Damien Millar. 12 September – 11 October 2008
 Tender – by Nicki Bloom. 21 November – 20 December 2008
 Impractical Jokes – by Charlie Pickering. 23 January – 2 February 2008

2007 season
 Holding the Man – Adapted by Tommy Murphy. from the book by Timothy Conigrave 8 February – 3 March 2007
 The Nightwatchman – by Daniel Keene. 9 March – 18 April 2007
 October – by Ian Wilding. 20 April – 26 May 2007
 The Story of the Miracles at Cookie's Table – by Wesley Enoch. 10 August – 22 September 2007
 King Tide – by Katherine Thomson. 18 October – 24 November 2007
 The Seven Needs – by 7-ON. (Donna Abela, Vanessa Bates, Hilary Bell, Noëlle Janaczewska, Verity Laughton, Ned Manning and Catherine Zimdahl) 27 March – 13 November 2007
 The Emperor of Sydney – by Louis Nowra. 16 August – 23 September 2007

Commissioned and premiered works
Playwrights whose work has premiered at Griffin include:
 Glenda Adams – The Monkey Trap (1998)
 Richard Barrett  – The Heartbreak Kid (1987)
 Hilary Bell  – Wolf Lullaby (1996), The Falls (2000)
 Andrew Bovell  – After Dinner (1989), Whisky on the Breath of a Drunk You Love (1992), Speaking in Tongues (1996), Ship of Fools (1999)
 Brendan Cowell – Rabbit (2003)
 Timothy Daly – Kafka Dances (1993), The Moonwalkers (1995), Private Visions of Gottfried Kellner (1999)
 Wesley Enoch – The Story of the Miracles at Cookie's Table (2007)
 Gordon Graham – The Boys (1991)
 Michael Gow – Away (1986), Europe (1987), Live Acts on Stage (1996)
 Noel Hodda – The Secret House (1987), Half Safe (1990),
 Ingle Knight – White Nancy (1982)
 Ned Manning – Us or Them (1984), Belonging (2007)
 Tommy Murphy – Strangers in Between (2005), Holding the Man (Adapted from the book by Timothy Conigrave, 2006)
 Louis Nowra – Death of Joe Orton, The Boyce Trilogy:The Woman with Dog's Eyes (2004), The Marvellous Boy (2005), The Emperor of Sydney (2006)
 Debra Oswald – Mr Bailey's Minder (2004), The Peach Season (2006)
 Stephen Sewell – The Father We Loved on a Beach by the Sea (1981), In Stillness My Sister Speaks to Me (1990), The Secret Death of Salvador Dali (2004), Three Furies Scenes from the life of Francis Bacon (2005)
 Katherine Thomson – Wonderlands (2003), "King Tide" (2007)
 Ian Wilding – Below (2000), Torrez (2004), "October" (2007)
 Catherine Zimdahl – Clark in Sarajevo'' (1998)

References

External links
Griffin Theatre website
SBW Foundation

See also
Stables Theatre, Sydney

Theatre in Sydney
Theatre companies in Australia
Awards established in 1998
Kings Cross, New South Wales